Telecommunications in Cambodia include telephone, radio, television, and Internet services, which are regulated by the Ministry of Posts and Telecommunications. Transport and posts were restored throughout most of the country in the early 1980s during the People's Republic of Kampuchea regime after being disrupted under Democratic Kampuchea (Khmer Rouge).

In January 1987, the Soviet-aided Intersputnik space communications station began operation in Phnom Penh and established two-way telecommunication links between the Cambodian capital and the cities of Moscow, Hanoi, Vientiane and Paris. The completion of the earth satellite station restored the telephone and telex links among Phnom Penh, Hanoi, and other countries for the first time since 1975. Although telecommunications services were initially limited to the government, these advances in communications helped break down the country's isolation, both internally and internationally.

Today, with the availability of mobile phones, communications are open to all, though the country's Prime Minister Hun Sen decreed that 3G mobile phones would not be allowed to support video calling.

Telephones

As of Q1 2020, Cambodia's mobile connection is at 21.4 million. Smart Axiata, a leading telecommunications company, in 2019 conducted a live trial of its 5G network with support from China's Huawei. The company said it expects to begin rolling out 5G services in Cambodia by the end of 2019.

GSMA predicted that by 2025, Cambodia will have approximately 24.3 million total mobile connections with smartphone connections up to 69%. The market is predicted to adopt 1.6 million of 5G connections within 5 years from 2020. Though so, it's believed that 4G still have room for growth and will continue to be the majority network connection.

The government state communications corporation is Telecom Cambodia, founded in 2006 as an expansion of the telecom operating department of the Ministry of Posts and Telecommunications.

Mobile networks

Radio and television

As of 2019, Cambodian broadcasters were a mixture of state-owned, joint public-private, and privately owned companies.

Radio stations
As of 2019, there were roughly 84 radio broadcast stations: 1 state-owned broadcaster with multiple stations and a large mixture of public and private broadcasters. Several international broadcasters are also available.

Phnom Penh

 Apsara Radio FM 97
 Angel Radio 96.3Mhz Kampot
 BBC World Service 100.0 MHz
 Dance Radio 96.6Mhz 
 DAP Radio FM 93.75
 Family FM 99.5
 Hang Meas Radio FM 104.5
 Koh Santepheap Daily FM 87.75
 National Radio Kampuchea
 Phnom Penh Radio FM 103
 Radio FM 90.5
 Radio Beehive FM 105
 DaunPenh eFM 87.50Mhz
 ABC News FM 107.5
 Lotus Radio FM 100.5hz
 Radio Free Asia
 Radio Khmer FM 107
 Radio Love FM 97.5
 Radio Town FM 102.3 MHz
 Raksmey Hang Meas Radio FM 95.7000
 Royal Cambodia Armed Forces Radio FM 98
 Voice of America Khmer
 Women's Media Centre of Cambodia (WMC) Radio FM 102

Provincial stations
There are radio stations in each of the following provinces: Banteay Meanchey, Battambang, Kampong Cham, Kampong Thom, Kampot, Kandal, Pailin, Preah Vihear, Siem Reap, Sihanoukville and Svay Rieng.

Television
Cambodia has 27 TV broadcast stations with most operating on multiple channels, including 1 state-operated station broadcasting from multiple locations, 11 stations either jointly operated or privately owned with some broadcasting from several locations. Multi-channel cable and satellite systems are also available. There is one Chinese joint venture television station with the Ministry of Interior. Several television and radio operators broadcast online only (often via Facebook).

Broadcast and cable networks

 PNN TV
 Apsara Television (TV11)
 Bayon Television
 Bayon News Television
 Cambodia Cable Television (CCTV)
 Cambodian News Channel (CNC)
 Cambodian Television Network (CTN)
 CTV 8 HD
 Hang Meas HDTV
 Khmer Television 9 HDTV (TV9 HDTV)
 My TV
 National Television of Cambodia (TVK)
 One TV (Royal Media Entertainment Corporation, LTD)
 Phnom Penh Municipal Cable Television (PPCTV Co., LTD)
 Phnom Penh Television (TV3)
 TV5 Cambodia
 One News

Provincial television stations
 Kandal Province - Broadcasting on channel 27, Bayon Television is Cambodia's only UHF channel. A private television company belonging to Prime Minister Hun Sen, it also operates Bayon Radio FM 95 MHz. It was established in January 1998.
 Mondulkiri - Established in 1999, relays TVK on channel 10.
 Preah Vihear - Established in 2006, broadcasts on channel 7.
 Ratanakiri - Established in 1993, relays TVK on channel 7.
 Siem Reap - Established in 2002, relays TV3 on channel 12.

Most viewed channels

Internet
 the number of internet users in Cambodia rose to 15.8 million, about 98.5% of the population. According to the Telecommunications Regulator of Cambodia (TRC), the number of registered SIM cards rose by 9.4 percent during the first half of the year, reaching 20.8 million. The SIM card market is saturated, with Cambodia now having more active SIM cards than people. According to TRC, there are six telecommunications firms in the country: Cellcard, Smart Axiata, Metfone, Seatel, Cootel, and qb. Three companies, Metfone, Cellcard, and Smart, account for 90% of users. TRC noted that, as of February 2019, Facebook had seven million users in Cambodia.

List of Internet service providers

 AngkorNet
 AZ (Online)
 Cambo Technology (ISP) Co., Ltd.
 Cambodia Internet Corp
 Cambotech
 Camintel
 Camnet (Telecom Cambodia)
 CB (Cambodian Broadband)
 CDC
 Cellcard (Mobitel)
 CooTel
 Chuan Wei 
 CIDC IT
 Citylink
 Digi ISP
 Dragon Royal Telecom
 EmCom
 Everyday
 Ezecom
 GTD
 Hiway Telecom
 Home Internet
 Kingtel Communications Limited
 MaxBIT
 MekongNet (Angkor Data Communication Group)
 Metfone
 Mobilastic
 Neocom ISP (NTC)
 NTC - NeocomISP Limited
 Open Net
 PCP
 PP Net Phone
 PPCTV Broadband Internet Service
 SingMeng Telemedia
 yes SEATEL Cambodia
 SINET(S.I Group Co., Ltd)
 Smart @Home
 TeleSURF
 Telecom Cambodia
 TODAY ISP (Today Communication Co., Ltd)
 Turbotech
 Vimean Seile
 Wicam
 WIP
 Wireless Internet Provider
 WirelessIP
 Y5Net (BDKTel Co,LTD)

Internet censorship and surveillance

In its Freedom on the Net 2013 report, Freedom House gives Cambodia a "Freedom on the Net Status" of "partly free".

Compared to traditional media in Cambodia, new media, including online news, social networks and personal blogs, enjoy more freedom and independence from government censorship and restrictions. However, the government does proactively block blogs and websites, either on moral grounds, or for hosting content deemed critical of the government. The government restricts access to sexually explicit content, but does not systematically censor online political discourse. Since 2011 three blogs hosted overseas have been blocked for perceived antigovernment content. In 2012, government ministries threatened to shutter internet cafes too near schools—citing moral concerns—and instituted surveillance of cafe premises and cell phone subscribers as a security measure.

Early in 2011, very likely at the urging of the Ministry of Posts and Telecommunications, all Cambodian ISPs blocked the hosting service Blogspot, apparently in reaction to a December 2010 post on KI-Media, a blog run by Cambodians from both inside and outside the country. The site, which is often critical of the administration, described the prime minister and other officials as "traitors" after opposition leader Sam Rainsy alleged they had sold land to Vietnam at a contested national border. All ISPs but one subsequently restored service to the sites following customer complaints. In February 2011, however, multiple ISPs reinstated blocks on individual Blogspot sites, including KI-Media, Khmerization—another critical citizen journalist blog—and a blog by the Khmer political cartoonist Sacrava.

There are no government restrictions on access to the Internet or credible reports that the government monitors e-mail or Internet chat rooms without appropriate legal authority. During 2012 NGOs expressed concern about potential online restrictions. In February and November, the government published two circulars, which, if implemented fully, would require Internet cafes to install surveillance cameras and restrict operations within major urban centers. Activists also reported concern about a draft “cybercrimes” law, noting that it could be used to restrict online freedoms. The government maintained it would only regulate criminal activity.

The constitution provides for freedom of speech and press; however, these rights were not always respected in practice. The 1995 press law prohibits prepublication censorship or imprisonment for expressing opinions; however, the government uses the penal code to prosecute citizens on defamation, disinformation, and incitement charges. The penal code does not prescribe imprisonment for defamation, but does for incitement or spreading disinformation, which carry prison sentences of up to three years. Judges also can order fines, which may lead to jail time if not paid. The constitution requires that free speech not adversely affect public security.

The constitution declares that the king is “inviolable,” and a Ministry of Interior directive conforming to the defamation law reiterates these limits and prohibits publishers and editors from disseminating stories that insult or defame government leaders and institutions. The continued criminalization of defamation and disinformation and a broad interpretation of criminal incitement constrains freedom of expression.

The law provides for the privacy of residence and correspondence and prohibits illegal searches; however, NGOs report that police routinely conduct searches and seizures without warrants.

Corruption remains pervasive and governmental human rights bodies are generally ineffective. A weak judiciary that sometimes fails to provide due process or fair trial procedures is a serious problem. The courts lack human and financial resources and, as a result, are not truly independent and are subject to corruption and political influence.

On 17 February 2021, the Cambodian government announced its plans to launch a censorship scheme called "National Internet Gateway" which heavily resembles China's Great Firewall, and it will get launched in February 2022.

See also

 Media of Cambodia
 Ministry of Posts and Telecommunications (Cambodia)

References

External links
 Networks: Cambodia 
 Ministry of Posts and Telecommunications 
 Telecom Cambodia
 Television stations in Cambodia
 "3G phones banned in anti-porn drive", China Daily (Associated Press), 26 May 2006. Retrieved 24 October 2013.